Ni vu, ni connu (literally "Neither seen, nor known"), also known by its English title Neither Seen, Nor Recognized, is a French comedy film from 1958, directed by Yves Robert and starring Louis de Funès. The film is based on the novel L'Affaire Blaireau (The Blaireau Case) by Alphonse Allais. The story had previously been adapted for the screen in 1923 and in 1932.

Plot 
In the wine-growing village of Montpaillard, the humorless gamekeeper Parju is determined to bring in the wily poacher Blaireau. One night, he is accidentally knocked out by Armand Fléchard, a young piano teacher, but is convinced the attacker was Blaireau and has him arrested. However, Blaireau knows how to take advantage of any situation, and what he makes of being arrested benefits the entire village, including Fléchard and his girlfriend, Arabella, the daughter of the local landowner.

Cast 

 Louis de Funès: Léon Blaireau, the poacher 
 Moustache: Ovide Parju, the gamekeeper
 Noëlle Adam: Arabella de Chaville, the landowner's daughter
 Madeleine Barbulée: Mme de Chaville, Arabella's mother
 Claude Rich: Armand Fléchard, piano teacher and Arabella's beloved
 Frédéric Duvallès: Monsieur Dubenoit, the mayor
 Roland Armontel: Léon de Chaville, the local landowner, Arabella's father
 Pierre Mondy: Monsieur Bluette, director of the local jail
 Jean-Marie Amato: Maître Guilloche, a lawyer, the mayor's political rival
 Lucien Hubert: Auguste, a villager
 Pierre Stéphen: the public prosecutor
 Robert Vattier: Monsieur Lerechigneux, the judge
 Paul Faivre: Victor, the chief jailkeeper
 Jean Bellanger: a prisoner, formerly a pedicurist
 Grégoire Gromoff: Grégory, a prisoner
 Henri Coutet: prisoner
 Max Montavon: prisoner
 Monette Dinay: Léontine, Dubenoit's housekeeper
 Danièle Delorme: admirer at the village fair
 Colette Ricard: Mademoiselle Rose
 Pierre Mirat: the owner of the local hotel
 Guy Favières: assistant to the mayor
 Marcel Rouze: policeman
 Charles Bayard: a legal assessor
 Yves Robert: wedding photographer
 Marc Blanchard: Monsieur Duranfort
 Raoul Saint-Yves: prisoner
 Jacques Couturier: policeman
 Francis Lemarque: whistling prisoner
 Bernard Charlan: doctor
 Jimmy Perrys: Antoine, a prisoner, formerly a tailor
 Jeanne de Funès (uncredited): admirer 
 Also: Fout-le-camp, a dog; Napoléon, a crow; Lucienne, a magpie; Parju, a pig; and the members of the "club de la fine gaule".

References

External links 
 Ni vu, ni connu (1958) at the Films de France

1958 films
1958 comedy films
French comedy films
1950s French-language films
French black-and-white films
Films directed by Yves Robert
Films about hunters
Remakes of French films
Films based on French novels
Pathé films
1950s French films